Copenhagen is the location of many notable buildings, representing a variety of eras as well as functions.

Castles and palaces

* Around 1420 a fortress was built where Kronborg is located today.

Churches

Profane buildings

* e.g. fairy tales author Hans Christian Andersen and scientists Niels Bohr and Hans Christian Ørsted

Fountains and monuments

Contemporary architecture

References